Lou Cutell (October 6, 1930 – November 21, 2021) was an American actor, who was perhaps best known for his appearance as Amazing Larry in the 1985 film Pee-wee's Big Adventure.

Life and career 
Cutell was born in New York City to Sicilian parents. He moved with his family to Los Angeles, California, where he received a bachelor's degree at the University of California.

Cutell began his acting career in 1961, appearing in the Broadway play The Young Abe Lincoln in the role of William Berry

Cutell made his television debut in 1964, guest-starring in The Dick Van Dyke Show. 
 
From the 1970s to the 1990s Cutell appeared and guest-starred in numerous films and television programs including Seinfeld, The Love Boat, Honey, I Shrunk the Kids, Alice, The Bob Newhart Show, Rhinoceros, The World's Greatest Lover, The Wild Wild West, The Mary Tyler Moore Show (and its spin-off Lou Grant), Barney Miller, The Black Marble, The Odd Couple II, Pee-wee's Big Adventure, My Mom's a Werewolf and Bridget Loves Bernie.

In the 1990s Cutell scripted and appeared in the Broadway play The Sicilan Bachelor. In 2010, Cutell starred in the Broadway play Viagara Falls, which he co-wrote with Joao Machado.

Cutell also continued appearing in film and television. He played a recurring role in Betty White's Off Their Rockers and guest-starred in other television programs. His final role was in the medical drama Grey's Anatomy, in 2015.

Death 
Cutell died on November 21, 2021, at the age of 91.

Filmography

Film

Television

References

External links 

Rotten Tomatoes profile

1930 births
2021 deaths
Male actors from New York City
American male film actors
American male stage actors
American male television actors
20th-century American male actors
21st-century American male actors
American theatre people
American people of Italian descent
University of California, Los Angeles alumni